is a Japanese company which manufactures, processes and distributes foodstuffs, spices and condiments, instant curries, and the manufacture and sale of cooked food. Their logo shows the S being the start of the word "Spice" and the B coming from the end of "Herb". 

The company invented tube wasabi and is well known for their Golden Curry Japanese curry cubes.

References

External links 

corporate website 

Food and drink companies based in Tokyo
Companies listed on the Tokyo Stock Exchange